Agelasta basispreta is a species of beetle in the family Cerambycidae. It was described by Edmund Heller  in 1923. It is known from the Philippines.

References

basispreta
Beetles described in 1923